Billy Paul Bodin (born 24 March 1992) is a professional footballer who plays for League One club Oxford United. He plays as a forward or as an attacking midfielder. Born in England, he represents the Wales national team. Bodin is the son of former Wales international Paul Bodin.

Bodin began his career with Swindon Town, spending periods on loan to Torquay United and Crewe Alexandra. After signing permanently and playing for two seasons at Torquay he spent a season at Northampton Town. He played for Bristol Rovers for two and a half years before joining Preston North End in January 2018, where he remained for a further three seasons.

Having represented Wales at several youth levels, he was called up to the Wales senior squad for the first time on 15 March 2018.

Club career

Swindon Town
Bodin began his career with Swindon Town, moving from the youth set-up, where he finished top scorer in both the youth side and the reserves during the 2009–10 season, to become a professional in April 2010. Bodin was an unused substitute on the Swindon bench on 20 March 2010 in their 1–1 league draw against Norwich City.

On 2 October 2010, Bodin followed in his father's footsteps by making his first-team debut for Swindon Town as a late substitute in a 2–1 League One defeat to Dagenham & Redbridge, replacing Thomas Dossevi. Swindon were relegated to League Two after finishing 24th, and Bodin expressed hopes for first-team opportunities the following season.

Having returning to Swindon in early January 2012 from a loan spell, Bodin scored his first goals for the club, the final goal in a 4–1 victory over Southend United on 31 January 2012 and another in the next game, a 3–0 win over Crawley Town on 14 February 2012. His third goal came against Dagenham & Redbridge in a 4–0 win on 6 March 2012.

Torquay United (loan)
On 25 August 2011, Bodin joined Torquay United on loan until January 2012. He made his Torquay debut in a 1–1 draw with Dagenham & Redbridge on 27 August 2011, coming on as a substitute and winning a penalty, which was converted by Rene Howe. On 13 September 2011, he scored his first goal for the club in a 2–2 draw against Cheltenham Town, and he scored again the following week in a 3–3 draw against Rotherham United. His next goal came on 29 October 2015 in a 1–0 win over Hereford United, and he scored again on 5 November 2011 in a 3–0 win over Crewe. After his goal against Hereford United, manager Martin Ling predicted big things for Bodin since becoming established in the first team. On 2 January 2012, Bodin scored his 6th goal in a 2–1 win over Plymouth Argyle. Bodin's good performances led Torquay unsuccessfully to seek a loan extension until the end of the season. After leaving Torquay, Bodin paid tribute to Ling, crediting his tactical changes with stopping the club's nosedive at the start of the season.

Crewe Alexandra (loan)
In March 2012, he was loaned to Crewe Alexandra for the remainder of the season. Bodin made his debut for the club in a 1–0 win over Hereford United on 24 March 2012.

Torquay United
On 2 July 2012, Torquay United signed Bodin for an undisclosed fee believed to be around £70,000, beating Crewe who had also attempted to sign him. Bodin suffered knee ligament damage whilst playing for Torquay against Dagenham & Redbridge in April 2014. His contract expired during the summer of 2014.

Northampton Town
In January 2015, Bodin joined Northampton Town on a deal until the end of the season having spent time at the club during his knee ligament injury rehabilitation. Bodin made four substitute appearances for the Cobblers before leaving in the summer.

Bristol Rovers

2015–16 season
Bodin went on to sign for Bristol Rovers in July 2015 on a short-term deal, following a successful trial at the club.
He scored his first goal for Rovers in a 3–0 away win against Hartlepool,  his second against Morecambe in a 4–3 win away from home, and his third, a spectacular effort, in a 1–4 loss to Newport County. He also scored against Dagenham & Redbridge and high-flying Plymouth Argyle, to finish the season with 5 goals, helping his side to achieve promotion to Football League One. On 9 June 2016 he signed a new two-year deal to stay at Rovers.

2016–17 season
Bodin did not score in the 2016–17 season until a volley in a 3–2 defeat to Chesterfield in November. By the turn of the year he was on four goals, thanks to a Boxing Day hat trick in a 4–1 victory over Coventry City, all scored with his left foot: a shot from the edge of the box into the far top corner, a long shot from 25 yards and a penalty. He scored a fine goal against Northampton Town during a 5–0 thrashing, but it was overshadowed by teammate Ellis Harrison's four.

2017–18 season
Bodin scored his first two goals of the season with a brace on 8 August 2017, in a 4–1 EFL Cup victory over Cambridge United, his second match of the campaign. His first two league goals of the season came in a 3–2 victory away to Bury: a header from a cross from Joe Partington to make it 2–0 and a close-range effort to make it 3–0.

Bodin departed Bristol Rovers on 3 January 2018, having scored 13 goals in the first half of the season for the club.

Preston North End
On 3 January 2018, Bodin joined EFL Championship club Preston North End for an undisclosed fee, signing a two-and-a-half-year contract with the club. He was assigned shirt number 39 on his arrival at Deepdale. He made his debut on 6 January 2018 in a 5–1 victory away at Wycombe Wanderers in the FA Cup 3rd round. The injury problems that had plagued Bodin in the earlier part of his career returned during his time at Preston and he missed the entirety of the 2018–19 season with an anterior cruciate ligament injury.

In October 2019 he signed a new contract with PNE until summer 2021. On 13 May 2021, it was confirmed that Bodin would be leaving the club at the end of his contract.

Oxford United
On 30 June 2021, Bodin signed for EFL League One side Oxford United as a free agent on a one-year contract. In his first season, in which Oxford narrowly missed out on a play-off place, he scored six times in the league and once in the FA Cup. He expressed his wish to sign a new contract at the end of the season. On 9 June 2022, Bodin signed a new two-year deal.

International career
Bodin is eligible to play for Wales as his father, Paul Bodin, was born in Cardiff and he earned 23 caps for the senior team between 1990 and 1994. Bodin has represented Wales at Under-17, Under-19 and Under-21 level. In January 2013 he was selected in the Wales U21 squad for the friendly match against Iceland on 6 February 2013

He was called into the Welsh senior squad for the first time on 15 March 2018. He made his debut on 26 March 2018, coming on as a 67' minute substitute in the China Cup 1–0 final defeat to Uruguay.

Personal life
His father, Paul Bodin, is a former professional footballer.

Career statistics

Club

International

Honours
Swindon Town
 Football League Two: 2011–12

Crewe Alexandra
Football League Two play-offs: 2011–12

Bristol Rovers
Football League Two third-place promotion: 2015–16

Wales
China Cup runner-up: 2018

References

External links

1992 births
Living people
Sportspeople from Swindon
English footballers
Welsh footballers
Wales youth international footballers
Wales under-21 international footballers
Association football forwards
Swindon Town F.C. players
Torquay United F.C. players
Crewe Alexandra F.C. players
Northampton Town F.C. players
Bristol Rovers F.C. players
Preston North End F.C. players
Oxford United F.C. players
English Football League players
English people of Welsh descent
Wales international footballers